T42 may refer to:

Vehicles 
 T-42 Cochise, a twin-engined piston aircraft
 T42 medium tank, a 1950s American tank design
 T-42 super-heavy tank, a Soviet tank project from the inter-war period
 Slingsby T.42 Eagle, a British glider
 Cooper T 42 a series of racing cars participating in the Eläintarhan ajot competitions
 Mecklenburg T 42, a former class name for a Class 99 steam locomotive

Other uses 
 T42 (classification), a disability sport classification for above knee amputees
 IBM ThinkPad T42, a laptop model
 Ruth Airport, in Trinity County, California, United States